The Castle of Akrotiri, also known as Castle Akrotiri, Goulas or La Ponta, is a former Venetian castle on the Greek island of Santorini. The now-ruined castle lies at the center of the village of Akrotiri.

History 
The castle was built in the 13th century by the Republic of Venice, which had occupied Santorini in 1207. Eager to fortify the island, the Venetians constructed a number of fortresses and watchtowers at key points around the island. Near the small hillside village of Akrotiri, Venetians engineers constructed a new castle on top of an existing Byzantine watchtower; this castle became one of the most defensible positions on the island. The fortress remained unconquered throughout the first of the Ottoman-Venetian Wars before finally surrendering to the Ottomans in 1617. The castle remained in relatively good condition until it was reduced to a ruin by an earthquake in 1956.

References 

Santorini